Altamaha Park is an unincorporated community in Glynn County, in the U.S. state of Georgia.

History
A variant name was "Altama". The community has its name from the Altamaha River.

References

Unincorporated communities in Glynn County, Georgia
Unincorporated communities in Georgia (U.S. state)